Steve Knowlton (August 3, 1922 – October 1, 1998) was an American alpine skier. He competed in three events at the 1948 Winter Olympics.

References

1922 births
1998 deaths
American male alpine skiers
Olympic alpine skiers of the United States
Alpine skiers at the 1948 Winter Olympics
Sportspeople from Pittsburgh
20th-century American people